
Gmina Wietrzychowice is a rural gmina (administrative district) in Tarnów County, Lesser Poland Voivodeship, in southern Poland.

Villages
Gmina Wietrzychowice contains the villages and settlements of Demblin, Jadowniki Mokre, Miechowice Małe, Miechowice Wielkie, Nowopole, Pałuszyce, Sikorzyce, Wietrzychowice and Wola Rogowska.

Neighbouring gminas
Gmina Wietrzychowice is bordered by the gminas of Gręboszów, Koszyce, Opatowiec, Radłów, Szczurowa, Wojnicz and Żabno.

References
Polish official population figures 2006

Wietrzychowice
Tarnów County